Saaya is a 1989 Indian Hindi-language film directed by Keshu Ramsay and produced by Naval Kumar. It stars Shatrughan Sinha, Poonam Dhillon and music by Bappi Lahiri.

Cast
 Shatrughan Sinha as SP Ravi
 Poonam Dhillon as Supriya
 Danny Denzongpa as Rakesh
 Pinchoo Kapoor as Supriya's Father
 Viju Khote as Traffic Police
 Beena Banerjee as Beena

Songs

External links

1980s Hindi-language films
1989 films
Films scored by Bappi Lahiri